(an abbreviation of write to all) is a Unix command-line utility that displays the contents of a computer file or standard input to all logged-in users. It is typically used by root to send out shutting down message to all users just before poweroff.

Invocation
 reads the message from standard input by default when the filename is omitted. This is done by piping the output of the  command:
alice@sleipnir:~$ # `tty` to show the current terminal name
alice@sleipnir:~$ tty
/dev/pts/7
alice@sleipnir:~$ echo Remember to brush your teeth! | wall

The message may also be typed in much the same way  is used: invoking  by typing  and pressing  followed by a message, pressing  and +:
alice@sleipnir:~$ wall
Remember to brush your teeth!
^D

Using a here-string:
alice@sleipnir:~$ wall <<< 'Remember to brush your teeth!'

Reading from a file is also supported:
alice@sleipnir:~$ cat .important_announcement
Remember to brush your teeth!
alice@sleipnir:~$ wall .important_announcement # same as `wall !$`

All the commands above should display the following output on terminals that users allow write access to (see mesg(1)):
Broadcast Message from alice@sleipnir
  (/dev/pts/7) at 16:15 ...

Remember to brush your teeth!

See also 
 Jordan Hubbard § rwall incident

References
 
 
 
 

Unix user management and support-related utilities